Captive is a 1998 Canadian drama film directed by Roger Cardinal. The film stars Erika Eleniak and Michael Ironside.

Plot

After a suicide attempt, Samantha Hoffman finds herself trapped in an insane asylum.

Cast

Erika Eleniak as Samantha Hoffman
Michael Ironside as Detective Briscoe
Catherine Colvey as Doctor Kossim

External links

1998 films
Canadian drama films
English-language Canadian films
Quebec films
1990s English-language films
1990s Canadian films